O'Shea Deon Dugas (born September 22, 1996) is an American football offensive tackle for the Birmingham Stallions of the United States Football League (USFL). He played college football at Louisiana Tech.

College career
After graduating high school, he chose Louisiana Tech over Louisiana-Lafayette, Louisiana-Monroe, Memphis, Nevada, Southern Miss, and Tulane. At Louisiana Tech he earned Second-team All-Conference from 2016 to 2017, and First-team All Conference in 2018. He was also on the Conference USA All-Freshman Team in 2015.

Professional career

Cincinnati Bengals
After going undrafted in 2019 he was signed by the Cincinnati Bengals on May 10, 2019. On September 2, 2019 he was placed on injury reserve due to a knee injury during preseason. On November 11, 2020 he was signed to the practice squad. He was waived on September 3, 2020.

Edmonton Elks
Dugas was added to the active roster of the Edmonton Elks of the CFL on July 9, 2021. He did not play in a regular season game for the Elks and was released on July 29, 2021.

Birmingham Stallions
Dugas was selected in the 6th round of the 2022 USFL Draft by the Birmingham Stallions. After being ruled out for week 1 with a back injury, he was transferred to the team's practice squad on April 14, 2022. He was transferred back to the active roster on April 22.

References

Further reading

Living people
1996 births
People from Lafayette, Louisiana
Players of American football from Louisiana
American football offensive tackles
Louisiana Tech Bulldogs and Lady Techsters
Cincinnati Bengals players
Edmonton Elks players
Birmingham Stallions (2022) players